The International Journal of Intelligent Information Technologies is a quarterly peer-reviewed academic journal covering intelligent information technologies, especially agent-based systems. It was established in 2005 and is published by IGI Global. The editor-in-chief is Vijayan Sugumaran (Oakland University).

Abstracting and indexing
The journal is abstracted and indexed in:

References

External links

Publications established in 2005
English-language journals
Quarterly journals
IGI Global academic journals
Computer science journals
Artificial intelligence publications